The Printmakers is the first album by the pianist Geri Allen. It was recorded in February 1984 in Germany and released on the German Minor Music label.

Reception 

AllMusic awarded the album 4½ stars, stating: "This session will prove to be an ear-opening experience for those familiar with Geri Allen's more mainstream work." NPR called the album "a tight, imaginative trio session." The New York Times wrote that Allen's "ballads demonstrate a rich, coloristic sense of harmony, and she can hurtle through atonal passages with steel-fingered momentum."

Track listing
All compositions by Geri Allen
 "A Celebration of All Life" - 6:20	
 "Eric" - 5:29	
 "Running as Fast as You Can...TGTH" - 3:10	
 "M's Heart" - 4:52	
 "Printmakers" - 8:05	
 "Andrew" - 4:24	
 "When Kabuya Dances" - 6:48
 "D and V" - 1:55

Personnel 
 Geri Allen - piano
 Anthony Cox - double bass 
 Andrew Cyrille - drums, mouth percussion, timpani

References 

1985 debut albums
Geri Allen albums
Instrumental albums